This is an alphabetical index of articles related to gardening.

A
Aeroponics -
African Violet Society of America -
Akadama -
Alkali soil -
Allotment -
Alpine garden -
Alpine plant -
Amateur Gardening -
Andalusian patio -
Annual plant -
Aquaponics -
Aquascaping -
Aquatic plant -
Aquatic weed harvester -
Arboretum -
Arboriculture -
Artificial turf -
Artificial waterfall -
Atomic gardening -
Auckland Flower Show -
Australian Organic Farming and Gardening Society -
Avenue -
Averruncator -
Award of Garden Merit -
Axe

B
Backcrossing -
Back garden -
Bāgh -
Bare root -
Baroque garden -
Basal shoot -
BBC Gardeners' World - 
Bedding (horticulture) -
Belvedere -
Beneficial insect -
Beneficial weed -
Berry-picking rake -
Biblical garden -
Bibliography of hedges and topiary -
Biennial bearing -
Biennial plant -
Biofertilizer -
Bioherbicide -
Biological pest control -
Biopesticide -
Birth flower -
Bitter pit -
Blackheart -
Black rot -
Blanching -
Bletting -
Blight -
Blossom -
Bog garden -
Bokashi - 
Bolting - 
Bonded Fibre Matrix -
Bonsai -
Bonsai aesthetics -
Bonsai styles -
Boron deficiency -
Bosquet -
Botanical garden -
Bottle garden -
Bridge graft -
Britain in Bloom -
Broadcast seeding -
Broadfork -
Broadleaf weeds -
Broderie (garden feature) -
Brown patch -
Brushcutter -
Bulb -
Bulldog Tools -
Bundesgartenschau -
Butterfly gardening -
Byzantine gardens

C
Cachepot -
Cactus garden -
Calcium deficiency -
California native plants -
Canadian Tulip Festival -
Canadian Gardening -
Carpellody -
Celebrity gardener -
Centre for Wildlife Gardening -
Chance seedling -
Charbagh -
Chelsea Flower Show -
Chelsea Fringe -
Cherry blossom -
Chilling requirement -
Chinampa -
Chinese garden -
Chip budding -
Chlorosis -
Climate-friendly gardening -
Clipping -
Cloche - 
Cloud tree -
Cold frame -
Collective landscape -
Colonial Revival garden -
Color garden -
Computer-aided garden design -
Communal garden -
Community gardening -
Community gardens in Nebraska -
Community orchard -
Companion planting -
Complete English Gardener -
Compost -
Concours des villes et villages fleuris -
Concrete landscape curbing -
Conservation and restoration of historic gardens
Container garden -
Controlled-release fertiliser -
Controller (irrigation) -
Copper tape -
Cornish hedge -
Corn maze -
Cottage garden -
Crop -
Crop protection -
Crop rotation -
Cultigen -
Cultivar -
Cultivar group -
Cultivated plant taxonomy -
Cultivator -
Cushion plant -
Cut flowers -
Cutting

D
Daffodil Society -
Daisy grubber -
Deadheading -
Dead hedge -
Deadwood bonsai techniques -
Deciduous -
Deep water culture -
Defensible space (fire control) -
Deficit irrigation -
Deflowering -
Defoliant -
Desert greening -
Devon hedge -
Dibber -
Disease resistance in fruit and vegetables -
Division -
Double digging -
Double-flowered -
Drip irrigation -
Drought tolerance -
Dutch garden

E
Ecoscaping -
Edger -
Elevated park -
Energy-efficient landscaping -
English landscape garden -
Entente Florale -
Environmental design -
Ephemeral plant -
Ericaceous fertilizer -
Espalier -
Evergreen -
Evolutionary history of plants -
Expo 2016 -
Eyecatchers

F
Fairy ring -
False vivipary -
Fence -
Ferme ornée -
Fernery -
Fertigation -
Fertilizer -
Fertilizer burn -
Fine Gardening -
Floral clock -
Floral design -
Floral diagram -
Floral formula -
Floral industry -
Floral scent -
Floriade -
Floribunda -
Floriculture -
Floriculture in Canada -
Florissimo -
Floristic diversity -
Floristry -
Flower -
Flower bouquet -
Flower box -
Flower bulb cultivation in the Netherlands -
Flower delivery -
Flower frog -
Flower garden -
Flowering plant -
Flowerpot -
Flower preservation -
Fogponics -
Foliar feeding -
Foliar nutrient -
Folkewall -
Folly -
Foodscaping -
Forest gardening -
Formal garden -
Fountain -
Fountaineer -
French formal garden -
French intensive gardening -
French landscape garden -
Front garden -
Fruit -
Fruit tree -
Fruit tree forms -
Fruit tree propagation -
Fruit tree pruning -
Fusarium patch

G
Garden -
Garden at Buckingham Palace -
Garden-based learning -
Garden buildings -
Garden centre -
Garden city movement -
Garden club -
Garden Culture -
Garden design -
Garden designer -
Garden festival -
Garden fork -
Garden furniture -
Garden guns -
Garden hermit -
Garden History Society -
Garden hose -
Garden leave -
Garden Museum - 
Garden of Alcinous -
Garden of Eden -
Garden office -
Garden ornament -
Garden pond -
Garden railway -
Garden real estate -
Garden room -
Garden roses -
Garden sharing -
Garden sanctuary -
Garden square -
Garden structure -
Garden tool -
Garden tourism -
Garden waste dumping -
Garden window -
Garden World Images -
Garden writing -
Gardena (company) -
Gardener -
Gardeners' Question Time -
Gardeners' World -
Gardeners' World Live -
Gardenesque -
Gardening -
Gardening Australia -
Gardening in Alaska -
Gardening in New Zealand -
Gardening in restricted spaces -
Gardening in Scotland -
Gardening in Spain -
Gardening Naturally -
Gardens of ancient Egypt -
Gardens of Provence-Alpes-Côte d'Azur -
Gardens of Sallust -
Gardens of the French Renaissance -
Gardens of Versailles -
Gazebo -
Genetically modified tree -
German garden -
Germination -
Giardino all'italiana -	
Gloriette -
Gongshi -
Grafting -
Grafting wax -				
Grandi Giardini Italiani -
Grasscycling -
Grass shears -
Grass stitcher -
Gravel -
Greek gardens -
Greenhouse -
Green roof -
Green wall -
Green waste -
Grex -
Grotto -
Groundcover -
Groundskeeping -
Growbag -
Grow box -
Growing degree-day -
Growing region -
Growing season -
Grow shop -
Grow light -
Growroom -
Growstones -
Guerrilla gardening -
Gumbo

H
Haga trädgård -
Ha-ha -
Halophyte -
Hameau de la Reine -
Hampton Court Palace Flower Show -
Hand tool -
Hanging basket -
Hanging garden -
Hanging Gardens of Babylon -
Hardiness -
Hardiness zone -
Hard landscape materials -
Hardscape -
Hardpan -
Head gardener -
Hedge -
Hedgelaying -
Hedge maze -
Hedge trimmer -
Heirloom plant -
Herb -
Herbaceous border -
Herbaceous plant -
Herbal -
Herbalism -
Herbal tea -
Herbarium -
Herbchronology -
Herb farm -
Herbicide -
Heritage gardens in Australia - 
Hilling -
Historical hydroculture -
History of fertilizer -
History of flower arrangement -
History of gardening -
History of herbalism -
History of landscape architecture -
History of plant breeding -
History of plant systematics -
Hoe -
Hook -
Horaisan -
Hori hori -
Horticultural botany -
Horticultural fleece -
Horticultural flora -
Horticultural oil -
Horticultural society -
Horticultural therapy -
Horticulture -
Horticulture industry -
Horti Fair -
Horti Lamiani -
Hortus conclusus -
Hotbed -
Hot container composting -
Houseplant -
Houseplant care -
Hügelkultur -
Human uses of plants - 
Hybrid name -
Hybrid seed -
Hybrid tea rose -
Hydroponics -
Hydroseeding -
Hydrozoning

I
Ice pruning -
Ikebana -
Indigenous horticulture -
Inflorescence -
Infructescence -
Insectary plant -
Integrated pest management -
Intensive gathering -
Intercropping -
Intercultural Garden - 
International Code of Nomenclature for algae, fungi, and plants -
International Code of Nomenclature for Cultivated Plants -
International Garden Festival -
Introduced species -
Invasive species -
Iron deficiency -
Irrigation sprinkler -
Islamic garden -
Italian Renaissance garden

J
Japanese garden -
Japanese rock garden -
Jardiniere -
Jeux d'eau

K
Kenzan -
Keyhole garden -
Kirpi -
Kitchen garden -
Knot garden -
Korean flower arrangement -
Korean garden -
Kokedama -
Kunai -
Kusamono and shitakusa

L
Landscape -
Landscape architect -
Landscape architecture -
Landscape contracting -
Landscape design -
Landscape detailing -
Landscape engineering -
Landscape fabric -
Landscape garden -
Landscape lighting -
Landscape maintenance -
Landscape manager -
Landscape planning -
Landscape products -
Landscaping -
Language of flowers -
Lawn -
Lawn aerator -
Lawn mower -
Lawn ornament -
Lawn sweeper -
Layering -
Leaf -
Leaf blower -
Leaf mold -
Leaf scorch -
Leaf spot -
Leaf vegetable -
Legume -
Limbing -
Linear aeration -
Linear park -
Liners -
Lingnan garden -
Living mulch -
Living root bridges -
Loam -
Loppers -
Love Your Garden

M
Manganese deficiency -
Marcescence -
Market garden -
Mary garden -
Master gardener program -
Matrix planting -
Mattock -
Maze -
Mechanical weed control -
Medicinal plants -
Melbourne International Flower and Garden Show -
Microbudding -
Micro-irrigation -
Microtubing -
Molybdenum deficiency -
Monastic garden -
Monocarpic -
Monopteros -
Moon bridge -
Moon gate -
Mosaiculture -
Mother plant -
Mughal gardens -
Mulch -
Multiple cropping -
Multipurpose tree

N
National Garden Festival -
National Tulip Day -
Native plant -
Natural landscaping -
Naturescaping -
Nature therapy -
Nematode -
Nitrogen deficiency -
Niwaki -
No-dig gardening -
Noxious weed -
Nurse grafting

O
Offset -
Olericulture -
Orchard -
Orchidelirium -
Orangery -
Organic fertilizer -
Organic hydroponics -
Organic horticulture -
Organic lawn management -
Organic movement -
Ornamental bulbous plant -
Ornamental grass -
Ornamental plant -
Orthodox seed

P
P-Patch -
Palmetum -
Palm house -
Paradise garden -
Parasitic plant -
Parterre -
Passive hydroponics -
Patio garden -
Patte d'oie -
Pattern gardening -
Pavilion -
Perennial plant -
Pergola -
Peristyle -
Permaculture -
Persian gardens -
Persian powder -
Pest control -
Pesticide -
Pesticide application -
Pesticide drift -
Pesticide resistance -
Philosophical garden -
Phosphorus deficiency -
Photosynthesis -
Physic garden -
Physiological plant disorder -
Phytotron -
Picotee -
Pineapple pit -
Plant -
Plant anatomy -
Plant breeders' rights -
Plant breeding -
Plant collecting -
Plant community -
Plant disease forecasting -
Plant disease resistance -
Plant ecology -
Plant factory -
Plant hormone -
Plant identification -
Plant LED incubator -
Plantlet -
Plant litter -
Plant morphology -
Plant nursery -
Plant pathology -
Plant propagation -
Plant taxonomy -
Plant tissue culture -
Plant variety (law) -
Plantsman -
Plasticulture -
Plastic mulch -
Playscape -
Pleaching -
Pleasure garden -
Pollarding -
Pollination -
Pollinator garden -
Polyculture -
Polytunnel -
Pond liner -
Post-harvest losses -
Post hole digger -
Potassium deficiency -
Pot farming -
Pot-in-pot -
Potting bench -
Potting soil -
Precision seeding -
Pruning -
Pruning shears -
Pseudanthium -
Pulse drip irrigation

Q
 Quiet area

R
Rain garden -
Rainwater harvesting - 
Raised bed gardening -
Rake - 
Reflecting pool -
Remontancy -
Rhubarb forcer -
Ring culture -
Ripening -
Robotic lawn mower -
Rock garden -
Roji -
Roman garden -
Roof garden -
Root -
Root barrier -
Root rot -
Rootstock -
Root trainer -
Rose -
Rose (symbolism) -
Rose garden -
Rose hip -
Rose show -
Rose trial grounds -
Row cover -
Royal Botanic Society -
Royal Horticultural Society -
Rubber mulch

S
Sacred garden -
Sacred herb -
Salt pruning -
School garden -
Sculpture garden -
Season extension -
Seawater greenhouse -
Seed -
Seed ball -
Seedbed -
Seed dormancy -
Seedling -
Seed orchard -
Seed saving -
Seed swap -
Seed testing -
Self-pollination -
Semi-deciduous -
Sensory garden -
Shade garden -
Shade tree -
Shakespeare garden -
Sharawadgi -
Shed -
Sheet mulching -
Shell grotto -
Shishi-odoshi -
Shoot -
Shovel -
Shredding -
Shrewsbury Flower Show -
Shrub -
Shrubbery -
Sichuanese garden -
Silver sand -
Singapore Garden Festival -
Slow gardening -
Smudge pot -
Snow mold -
Sod -
Sod roof -
Soft landscape materials -
Softscape -
Soil -
Soil conditioner -
Soil conservation -
Soil defertilisation -
Soil fertility -
Soil life -
Soil moisture sensor -
Soil pH -
Soil test -
Soil type -
Sowing -
Space in landscape design -
Spade -
Spanish garden -
Species description -
Specific replant disease -
Spent mushroom compost - 
Sprigging -
Sprouting -
Square foot gardening -
Stale seed bed -
Statuary -
Stepping stones -
Strewing herb -
String trimmer -
Stumpery -
Sub-irrigated planter -
Subshrub -
Subsoil -
Succession planting -
Sustainable gardening -
Sustainable landscape architecture -
Sustainable landscaping -
Sustainable planting -
Synergistic gardening

T
Taihu stone -
Tapestry lawn -
Taproot -
Tatton Park Flower Show -
Tea garden -
Telegarden -
Terrace garden -
Thatch -
The Profitable Arte of Gardening -
Therapeutic garden -
Thinning -
Three Great Gardens of Japan -
Tomato grafting -
Topiary -
Topsoil -
Tōrō -
Tower Garden -
Transplant experiment -
Transplanting -
Trap crop -
Tree -
Tree paint -
Tree planting -
Tree shaping -
Tree shelter -
Tree topping -
Trellis -
Trial garden -
Tropical garden -
Triple mix -
Trowel -
Tuileries Garden -
Tulip festival -
Turf -
Turf maze -
Turf melting out

U
Upside-down gardening -
Urban horticulture -
Uses of compost

V
Variegation -
Variety -
Vascular plant -
Vase life -
Vegan organic gardening -
Vegetable bouquet -
Vegetable farming -
Vegetative reproduction -
Vermicompost -
Vernalization -
Vertical farming -
Victory garden -
Vine -
Vine training -
Vivarium -
Volunteer

W
Walled garden -
Waru Waru -
Water feature -
Water garden -
Water sprout -
Water timer -
Watering can -
Weed -
Weed control -
Weeder -
Weed of cultivation -
Weed science -
Wheelbarrow -
Wilderness (garden history)
Wildflower -
Wildlife garden -
Wilting -
Windbreak -
Window box -
Windowfarm -
Winter garden -
Winter sowing -
Withy -
Woodchipper -
Woodland garden -
Woody plant -
Worshipful Company of Gardeners

X
Xeriscaping

Y
Yates (company) -
Yukitsuri

Z
Zen garden -
Zero-turn mower -
Zig zag bridge -
Zinc deficiency

Lists
Botanical gardens -
Chinese gardens -
Companion plants -
Culinary herbs and spices -
Domesticated plants -
Edible flowers -
Foliage plant diseases -
Fungicides -
Garden and horticulture books -
Garden features -
Garden plants -
Garden types -
Gardens -
Gardens in England -
Gardens in Italy -
Gardens in Scotland -
Gardens in Wales -
Herbs with known adverse effects -
Horticultural magazines -
Horticulture and gardening books/publications -
Invasive species -
Landscape architects -
Landscape gardens -
Leaf vegetables -
Organic gardening and farming topics -
Pests and diseases of roses -
Pest-repelling plants -
Plant hybrids -
Plant orders -
Plants by common name -
Plants used in herbalism -
Poisonous flowers -
Poisonous plants -
Professional gardeners -
Remarkable Gardens of France -
Root vegetables -
Rosa species -
Sensory gardens -
Snowdrop gardens -
Lists of cultivars -
Lists of plant diseases -
Lists of plants -
Lists of useful plants

Category
 :Category:Gardening

See also

 Glossary of botanical terms
 Glossary of leaf morphology
 Outline of organic gardening and farming

Wikipedia indexes